Ember from the Sun is a novel by Mark Canter published by New English Library in 1995.

Plot summary
Ember from the Sun is a novel in which Yute Nahadeh finds the frozen body of a Neanderthal woman in an ice cave. After discovering a fetus,  he implants it in a 20th-century surrogate mother who gives birth to Ember, a genuine Neanderthal.

Reception
Richard Jones reviewed Ember from the Sun for Arcane magazine, rating it an 5 out of 10 overall. Jones comments that "Canter could have chosen a bizarre ending, an apocalyptic one, a happy or a sad one. Instead he goes for the Crap Ending option and you come away feeling cheated and used. Shame, really. I was willing to forgive the various failures in plot and style because I was quite getting into the Neanderthals."

Kirkus Reviews states "An effective blend of scientific fact and shamanistic fancy, one that weaves a genuinely magic spell."

Publishers Weekly states: "Canter's approach fails to do his premise, or his characters, particularly the appealing Ember, full justice."

Entertainment Weekly rated the book a "C" and states that "Ember from the Sun'''s plucked straight from the pulp fantasies of Edgar Rice Burroughs."

Reviews
Review by Helen Gould (1995) in Vector 186 
Review by Paul J. McAuley (1996) in Interzone, #104 February 1996Kliatt''

References

1995 American novels
1995 science fiction novels
New English Library books